Have a Smile With Me is a 1964 album by Ray Charles. In a reversal of the previous concept album Sweet & Sour Tears, this album is filled with humorous songs. In 1997, it was packaged together with 1963's Ingredients in a Recipe for Soul on a two-for-one CD reissue on Rhino with historical liner notes.

Track listing

Side one
 "Smack Dab in the Middle" (Charles E. Calhoun) – 3:21
 "Feudin' and Fightin'" (Al Dubin, Burton Lane) – 2:15
 "Two Ton Tessie" (Lou Handman, Roy Turk) – 4:00
 "I Never See Maggie Alone" (Everett Lynton, Henry B. Tisley) – 5:46
 "Move It On Over" (Hank Williams) – 2:40

Side two
 "Ma (She's Making Eyes at Me)" (Sidney Clare, Con Conrad) – 3:30
 "The Thing" (Charles Randolph Grean) – 2:28
 "The Man with the Weird Beard" (Milton Drake, Al Hoffman, Jerry Livingston) – 3:59
 "The Naughty Lady of Shady Lane" (Roy C. Bennett, Sid Tepper) – 3:12
 "Who Cares (For Me)" (Don Gibson) – 2:19

Personnel
The Ray Charles Orchestra
Ray Charles – vocals, piano
The Raelettes - background vocals
Benny Carter (tracks: A1, A2, B1), Gerald Wilson (tracks: A5, B5), Johnny Parker (tracks: A3, A4, B2, B3, B4) - arrangements

External links
[ Album review at AMG]

1964 albums
Ray Charles albums
ABC Records albums
Albums arranged by Benny Carter
Albums arranged by Gerald Wilson
Albums produced by Ray Charles
Rhino Records albums